This list is of the Places of Scenic Beauty of Japan located within the Prefecture of Kanagawa.

National Places of Scenic Beauty
As of 1 January 2021, six Places have been designated at a national level.

Prefectural Places of Scenic Beauty
As of 1 May 2020, three Places have been designated at a prefectural level.

Municipal Places of Scenic Beauty
As of 1 May 2020, five Places have been designated at a municipal level.

Registered Places of Scenic Beauty
As of 1 January 2021, six Monuments have been registered (as opposed to designated) as Places of Scenic Beauty at a national level.

See also
 Cultural Properties of Japan
 List of parks and gardens of Kanagawa Prefecture
 List of Historic Sites of Japan (Kanagawa)

References

External links
  Cultural Properties in Kanagawa Prefecture

Tourist attractions in Kanagawa Prefecture
Places of Scenic Beauty

ja:Category:神奈川県にある国指定の名勝